Service is a 1932 play by the British writer Dodie Smith. It is set around the lives of the Service family who own a department store and whose fortunes are hit by the Great Depression.

Adaptation
In 1933 it was adapted into an American film Looking Forward directed by Clarence Brown and starring Lionel Barrymore and Lewis Stone.

Bibliography
 Gale, Maggie. West End women: women and the London stage, 1918-1962. Routledge, 1996.

Plays by Dodie Smith
1932 plays
West End plays
British plays adapted into films
Plays set in London